National Science Library and Resource Centre (NSLRC) (Sinhala: ජාතික විද්‍යා පුස්තකාලය හා සම්පත් මධ්‍යස්ථානය -ශ්‍රී ලංකාව Jathika Vidya Pusthakalaya Ha Sampath Madhyasthanaya - Shri Lankawa) of the National Science Foundation of Sri Lanka is the National Focal Point for the dissemination of Science and Technology Information in Sri Lanka.

Library databases
 Sri Lanka Science Index (SLSI)

e-Repository
 National Science Foundation of Sri Lanka Digital Repository

Libraries in Colombo District
Government agencies of Sri Lanka
Education in Colombo
Science libraries
Scientific organisations based in Sri Lanka
Buildings and structures in Colombo